The South Wellington station is a former railway station in South Wellington, British Columbia. The station was a stop on Via Rail's Dayliner service, which ended in 2011. The station is on the Southern Railway of Vancouver Island mainline.

Footnotes

External links 
Via Rail Station Description

Via Rail stations in British Columbia
Disused railway stations in Canada